45:33 Remixes is an album by LCD Soundsystem consisting entirely of remixes of their 2006 release 45:33.  It was released as a series of 12" singles and a CD compilation on September 14, 2009.

Critical reception

Track listing

CD Compilation
 "45:33" Part 1 (Runaway Remix)
 "45:33" Part 2 (Prince Language Remix)
 "45:33" Part 3/4 (Prins Thomas Diskomiks Remix)
 "45:33" Part 4 (Theo Parrish's Space Cadet Remix)
 "45:33" Part 4 (Trus' Me Remix)
 "45:33" Part 4 (Padded Cell Remix)
 "45:33" Part 5 (Pilooski Remix)
 "45:33" Part 6 (Riley Reinhold Remix)

Vinyl singles
 "45:33" (Prins Thomas Diskomiks Remix)/"45:33" (Runaway Remix)
 "45:33" (Riley Reinhold Remix)/"45:33" (Trus' Me Remix)
 "45:33" (Pilooski Remix)/"45:33" (Theo Parrish's Space Cadet Remix)
 "45:33" (Padded Cell Remix)/"45:33" (Prince Language Remix)

References

LCD Soundsystem albums
2009 remix albums
DFA Records remix albums